Ifumi is an Indonesian crispy deep fried thick noodle dish, popular in Maritime Southeast Asia, served in a thick savoury sauce with pieces of meat or seafood and vegetables. The dishes are to be served hot while the noodles are still crisp until the noodles are softened by the sauce and are ready to be eaten. The dish is one of the most popular noodle dishes in Chinese Indonesian cuisine. The type of noodle being used in this dish is the thick yi mein noodle, hence the origin of its name. It is quite similar to mie kering noodles from Makassar.

Ingredients

Unlike other Chinese Indonesian favourite noodles with a soft texture—such as mie goreng for example, ifumi has a crispy texture akin to dried instant noodles or crackers. This is because the noodles were deep fried in palm oil first.

The vegetable sauce is actually quite similar to the other Chinese Indonesian favourite, cap cai and it is made of stir-fried carrots, cloud ear mushroom, choy sum or napa cabbage, cauliflower, garlic and onion  all seasoned with oyster sauce, ang ciu Chinese cooking wine, and a little bit of salt and sugar. The vegetable sauce then has water added to it, and it is mixed with dissolved corn starch as a thickening agent. This savoury thick sauce with pieces of meat and vegetables is cooked separately, and it is later poured upon the dry crispy noodles prior to serving the dish.

See also

 Indonesian noodles
 Laksa
 Mie kering
 Mie kuah
 List of Indonesian dishes
 Chinese Indonesian cuisine

References

External links
 I Fu Mie Recipes
 I Fu Mi Recipe (in Indonesian)
 I Fu Mie cooking instructions (from YouTube)
 

Indonesian Chinese cuisine
Indonesian noodle dishes